Ranaldo Antonio Bailey (born 5 July 1996) is a Barbadian footballer who plays as a defender for the Barbados national team. Bailey played collegiate soccer for USC Aiken.

Career

Club career

Invited to the 2015 MLS Caribbean Combine, Bailey attracted the attention of Northern Ireland's Ballymena United, embarking on a trial there in April that year. However, 
when Ballymena offered him a contract, the defender rejected it, explaining that pecuniary conditions there did not satisfy him.

International career
At the youth level he played in the 2013 CONCACAF U-17 Championship.

Personal life

He is the son of former footballer Horace Stoute.

References

External links 
 
 USA Aiken Pacers bio

Living people
1996 births
Barbadian footballers
Association football defenders
Barbados international footballers
Barbados youth international footballers
Pride of Gall Hill FC players
UWI Blackbirds FC players
Morvant Caledonia United players
Barbados Defence Force SC players
USC Aiken Pacers men's soccer players
TT Pro League players
Barbadian expatriate footballers
Barbadian expatriate sportspeople in Trinidad and Tobago
Barbadian expatriate sportspeople in the United States
Expatriate footballers in Trinidad and Tobago
Sportspeople from Bridgetown